Lake Erie Speedway is a 3/8 mile (0.6 km) paved, banked oval race track which opened on June 21, 2002 in Erie County, Pennsylvania south of North East, Pennsylvania, United States. It was a member of the NASCAR Whelen All-American Series from 2002-2013 when the track dropped the NASCAR sanctioning body and started only holding a few special event races a year as an unsanctioned track. Lake Erie Speedway previously ran five weekly race divisions including: Modifieds, Street Stocks, Compacts, Legends, and Bandoleros.

The track formerly hosted the ARCA RE/MAX Series, the NASCAR Busch East/North Series, the NASCAR Winston Modified Tour, ASA National Tour and CARS Hooters Pro Cup Series.

External links
Official Website
Lake Erie Speedway race results at Racing-Reference

Motorsport venues in Pennsylvania
ARCA Menards Series tracks
NASCAR tracks
Buildings and structures in Erie County, Pennsylvania
Tourist attractions in Erie County, Pennsylvania